Omaatla Kebatho (born 16 June 1993) is a Botswana footballer.

International career

International goals
Scores and results list Botswana's goal tally first.

Honours

Club
Orapa United
Botswana FA Cup: 1
2018-19

Individual
Botswana FA Cup Top Goalscorer: 2019

References

External links 
 

1993 births
Living people
Botswana footballers
Botswana international footballers
Association football forwards
ECCO City Green players
Vasco da Gama (South Africa) players
Orapa United F.C. players
Botswana expatriate footballers
Expatriate soccer players in South Africa
Botswana expatriate sportspeople in South Africa
National First Division players